SRM University, Sikkim, formally Shri Ramasamy Memorial University, Sikkim, is a private university created through The Shri Ramasamy Memorial University, Sikkim Act, 2013 (Act No.13 of 2013) in October 2013. This venture was started by the SRM Group, who have more than 3 decades of experience in the education management industry.

Academics 
The SRM University, Sikkim provides the  undergraduate and postgraduate programs under 3 main constituent faculties namely, School of Information Technology, School of Management & Commerce and School of Hospitality and Tourism Studies. Semester pattern of examinations and credit system are followed for all the programs.

Admission and scholarships 
Admissions are based on the rules and regulations of the University Grants Commission (UGC)/Competent Authorities. Financial Aid and Scholarships are provided to students belonging to reserved communities as per the regulations laid by the Government of Sikkim. Scholarships are provided to deserving candidates. The financial aid is provided under the following categories.
 Meritorious Students
 Socially/economically disadvantaged candidates
 Physically Challenged
 Sikkim Natives/Locals (based on Government Norms).

Infrastructure

Hostel Accommodation 
The University provides hostel accommodation for boys and girls separately.

See also 
 SRM Institute of Science and Technology

References

External links 
 

Engineering colleges in Sikkim
2013 establishments in Sikkim
Educational institutions established in 2013
Universities in Sikkim
Universities and colleges in Sikkim
Private universities in India